Maipú Department is a department and municipality located in the north west of Mendoza Province in Argentina.

The department was created in 1858 and named in memory of the Battle of Maipú, which took place in Chile, 1818 during the South American Wars of Independence.

Districts
Maipú
Coquimbito
Cruz de Piedra
Fray Luis Beltrán
General Gutiérrez
General Ortega
Las Barrancas
Lunlunta
Luzuriaga
Rodeo del Medio
Russell
San Roque

Sport

Maipú is home to Deportivo Maipú, a football club that play in the regionalised 3rd Division.

See also
Mendoza wine
Independence of Chile
Independence of Argentina

External links
Municipal website (Spanish)
Club Deportivo Maipú (Spanish)

Wine regions of Argentina
Departments of Mendoza Province
1858 establishments in Argentina